Aleksei Sergeyevich Skornyakov (born 16 March 1993) is a Russian professional football player.

Club career
He made his Russian Football National League debut for FC Sokol Saratov on 19 October 2014 in a game against FC Volgar Astrakhan.

External links
 
 Career summary at sportbox.ru

1993 births
People from Dubna
Living people
Russian footballers
Russia youth international footballers
Association football goalkeepers
FC Sokol Saratov players
FC Spartak Moscow players
FC Tekstilshchik Ivanovo players
FC Torpedo Moscow players
FC Saturn Ramenskoye players
FC Arsenal Tula players
FC Znamya Truda Orekhovo-Zuyevo players
Sportspeople from Moscow Oblast